Drinkbox Studios Inc. is a Canadian video game developer based in Toronto. The company was founded in April 2008 by Chris Harvey, Ryan MacLean and Graham Smith, three programmers previously employed by Pseudo Interactive, which closed earlier that year. Drinkbox is best known for the Guacamelee! series of games.

History 

In 2008, Toronto-based video game developer Pseudo Interactive laid off the majority of its staff before closing down completely. Out of the laid-off employees, many left Toronto to work in other places, while three programmers, Chris Harvey, Ryan MacLean and Graham Smith, stayed to found their own game studio in April that year. Their idea was to create a game company that would create games they would want to play. Initially, the company was called Not a Number Software, but the team quickly considered the name to be a bad choice and changed it to DrinkBox Studios. In the weeks following the DrinkBox' foundation, they hired a senior artist and a designer to move forward with the company as a five-man team.

Games developed

References

External links 

 

2008 establishments in Ontario
Apple Design Awards recipients
Canadian companies established in 2008
Companies based in Toronto
Privately held companies of Canada
Video game companies established in 2008
Video game companies of Canada
Video game development companies